The Master Touch (Italian: Un uomo da rispettare) is a 1972 crime film directed by Michele Lupo starring Kirk Douglas and Florinda Bolkan.

Plot summary 
Steve Wallace, a safecracker, has just been released from prison. He attempts one last burglary with the help of a circus gymnast in Germany, who later becomes fat.

Cast 
 Kirk Douglas as Steve Wallace
 Giuliano Gemma as Marco
 Florinda Bolkan as Anna
 Wolfgang Preiss as Miller
 Reinhard Kolldehoff as Detective Hoffman
 Romano Puppo as Miller's Lieutenant
 Bruno Corazzari as Eric
 John Bartha as Murdered Security Guard
 Allen Stanley
 Vittorio Fanfoni
 Luigi Antonio Guerra

Release
The Master Touch was distributed theatrically in Germany in 8 December 1972.

References

External links 
 
 
 

1972 films
1972 crime drama films
1970s crime thriller films
1970s heist films
Italian crime thriller films
German crime thriller films
Italian heist films
German heist films
West German films
English-language German films
English-language Italian films
Films scored by Ennio Morricone
Films set in Hamburg
Films set in West Germany
1970s Italian films
1970s German films